Lingappa Narayana Swamy (born 1 July 1959) is an Indian judge and the former Chief Justice of Himachal Pradesh High Court. He is former Judge of Karnataka High Court. He served as the Acting Chief Justice of Karnataka High Court from 18 January 2019 to 9 May 2019, after the elevation of Justice Dinesh Maheshwari to Supreme Court of India.

Career 
Swamy is B.A., LL.M. He was enrolled as an Advocate on 15 October 1987. He practised before the High Court of Karnataka, Karnataka Administrative Tribunal & Central Administrative Tribunal. He was appointed an Additional Judge of the Karnataka High Court on 4 July 2007 and Permanent Judge on 17 April 2009. He was appointed Acting Chief Justice of Karnataka High Court on 18 January 2019. He was appointed Chief justice of Himachal Pradesh High Court on 6 October 2019. He retired on 30 June 2021.

References 

1959 births
Living people
Indian judges